Megachile cinnamomea is a species of bee in the family Megachilidae.

It was described by Alfken in 1935.

References

Cinnamomea
Insects described in 1935